Viv Huzzey (24 July 1876 – 16 August 1929) was a Welsh rugby union and rugby league wing who played club rugby for Cardiff and Oldham RLFC (Heritage № 60). He won five caps for Wales. Huzzey was also an international British baseball player.

Rugby career

Union
Huzzey was a fast wing with a strong scoring record, averaging around twenty tries a season. A popular player he worked well in partnership with Welsh rugby legend Gwyn Nicholls for both Cardiff and later for Wales. In 1900 at a general meeting for Cardiff Rugby Club, Nicholls and Huzzey were the only two names put forward for the position of captain for the next season. Nicholls had been the captain the previous two seasons, and Huzzey his vice, deputising well when Nicholls was absent. At the meeting Nicholls announced he was removing himself from contention to allow Huzzey the role, which caused the members to lobby Nicholls to change his mind in a very emotionally charged situation. Nicholls relented and was re-elected. Huzzey felt betrayed by this move, as it was believed Huzzey would have otherwise been selected.

League
In September 1900 Huzzey 'Went North', joining rugby league side Oldham RLFC (Heritage No. 60).

RU International career
Huzzey gained his first international cap against Ireland on 18 March 1898 at Limerick under the captaincy of Billy Bancroft. This was Wales's first match after their exile caused by the Gould Affair, but the team had not lost form and beat Ireland 11-3, with Huzzey scoring one of two tries. He was back for Wales against England on 2 April and although Wales lost, Huzzey played well scoring all the Welsh points with a try and a drop goal. Huzzey was back the next season in the 1899 Home Nations Championship, and in the first game against England at St. Helens, Wales were rampant; Willie Llewellyn scored four tries on his début, and Huzzey scoring two tries himself. Huzzey's last two international matches against Ireland and Scotland saw him on the losing side. It is unknown if Huzzey would have won further caps as his decision to switch to the professional game of rugby league made him ineligible for further selection.

RU International matches played
Wales
  1898, 1899
  1898, 1899
  1899

Baseball
In 1908 Huzzey turned out for Wales in the first international British baseball match, contested between Wales and England. The game was played at the Harlequins Ground in Cardiff, Wales winning 122-114. In the Welsh team on that day were two other Cardiff RFC players, Jack ‘Buzzer’ Heaven and Charlie Spackman.

Bibliography

References

1876 births
1929 deaths
Canton RFC players
Cardiff RFC players
Glamorgan County RFC players
Oldham R.L.F.C. players
Rugby league players from Torfaen
Players of British baseball
Rugby union players from Torfaen
Rugby union wings
Wales international rugby union players
Welsh rugby league players
Welsh rugby union players